Abderrahim Najah (born 20 November 1984) is a Moroccan basketball player currently playing for AS Salé of the Division Excellence.

Professional career
Najah started his career in 2004 with Raja Oval where he played five years. In 2009, he transferred to AS Salé.

In 2017, Najah won the FIBA Africa Clubs Champions Cup with Salé. He was on Salé's roster for the 2021 BAL season, the first season of the Basketball Africa League.

National team career
Najah is a member of the Morocco national basketball team. He participated in both the 2007 and 2009 FIBA Africa Championship.

BAL career statistics

|-
| style="text-align:left;"|2021
| style="text-align:left;"|AS Salé
| 4 || 4 || 22.9 || .484 || .000 || .625 || 8.0 || 1.3 || .8 ||  1.3 || 10.0
|-
|- class="sortbottom"
| style="text-align:center;" colspan="2"|Career
| 4 || 4 || 22.9 || .484 || .000 || .625 || 8.0 || 1.3 || .8 ||  1.3 || 10.0

References

1984 births
Living people
Moroccan men's basketball players
AS Salé (basketball) players
Sportspeople from Casablanca